Terry K. Allen, (born November 29, 1968) professionally known as DJ Slip, is an American record producer from Inglewood, California. He is a founding member of gangsta rap groups Compton's Most Wanted and N.O.T.R.

Discography

Solo
2007: The Minority Report

with MC Eiht
1994: We Come Strapped
1996: Death Threatz
1997: Last Man Standing
2000: N' My Neighborhood ("Git Money" Featuring Techniec and Tha Chill)

with Compton's Most Wanted
1990: It's a Compton Thang
1991: Straight Checkn 'Em
1992: Music to Driveby
2000: Represent
2006: Music to Gang Bang

References

External links
DJ Slip at MySpace.

American hip hop record producers
American hip hop DJs
Living people
1972 births